Ziobro is a Polish surname. Notable people with the surname include:

 Jan Ziobro (born 1991), Polish ski jumper
 Jan Ziobro (politician) (born 1989), Polish politician
 Zbigniew Ziobro (born 1970), Polish politician

See also
 

Polish-language surnames